Jubilee is the fifth studio album by Canadian alternative country band The Deep Dark Woods. The record was released on September 30, 2013 through Sugar Hill Records. "18th of December" was released as the first single from the album.

Track listing
All songs written by Ryan Boldt except "Miles and Miles", "East St. Louis," and "The Beater" written by Chris Mason. "The Same Thing," "Red, Red Rose," and "Picture on My Wall" written by Ryan Boldt and Clayton Linthicum. "Bourbon Street" written by Chris Mason and Burke Barlow.
"Miles and Miles" - 5:28
"18th of December" - 3:50
"Picture on My Wall" - 4:32
"Red, Red Rose" - 2:16
"Gonna Have A Jubilee" - 4:02
"Pacing the Room" - 5:17
"East St. Louis" - 5:43
"A Voice is Calling" - 5:43
"I Took to Whoring" - 3:57
"It's Been a Long Time" - 3:26
"Bourbon Street" - 4:05
"The Beater" - 6:53
"The Same Thing" - 10:29

Personnel
Ryan Boldt - vocals, guitars, bass guitar
Chris Mason - vocals, bass guitar, guitar, novachord
Lucas Goetz - vocals, drums/percussion, pedal steel
Geoff Hilhorst - piano, organs, wurlitzer, novachord, celesta, mellotron, vibraphone
Clayton Linthicum - guitars, autoharp

2013 albums
The Deep Dark Woods albums